This article serves as an index – as complete as possible – of all the honorific orders or similar decorations awarded by Brunei, classified by Monarchies chapter and Republics chapter, and, under each chapter, recipients' countries and the detailed list of recipients.

Awards

Brunei Royal Family 

They have been awarded :

 Family of Hassanal
 Hassanal Bolkiah
  Royal Family Order of the Crown of Brunei - Darjah Kerabat Mahkota Brunei - D.K.M.B. **
  Family Order of Brunei 1st Class - Darjah Kerabat Laila Utama Yang Amat Dihormati - D.K. (Laila Utama)
  Family Order of Brunei 2nd Class - Darjah Kerabat Seri Utama Yang Amat Dihormati - D.K. (Seri Utama)
  Order of the Islam Religion of the State of Brunei 1st Cl - Darjah Seri Ugama Islam Negara Brunei Yang Amat Bersinar Darjah Pertama - P.S.S.U.B. *
  Order of Splendid Valour 1st Cl - Darjah Paduka Laila Jasa Keberanian Gemilang Yang Amat Cemerlang Darjah Pertama - D.P.K.G. *
  Order of Famous Valour 1st Cl - Darjah Paduka Keberanian Laila Terbilang Yang Amat Gemilang Darjah Pertama - D.P.K.T. *
  Order of the Hero of the State of Brunei 1st Cl - Darjah Pahlawan Negara Brunei Yang Amat Perkasa Darjah Pertama - P.S.P.N.B.
  Order of Loyalty to the State of Brunei 1st Cl - Darjah Setia Negara Brunei Yang Amat Bahagia Darjah Pertama - P.S.N.B.
  Order of Merit of Brunei 1st Cl - Darjah Paduka Seri Laila Jasa Yang Amat Berjasa Darjah Pertama - P.S.L.J.
   Order of the Crown of Brunei 1st Cl - Darjah Seri Paduka Mahkota Brunei Yang Amat Mulia Darjah Pertama - S.P.M.B.
  Order of Gallantry of the State of Brunei 1st Cl - Darjah Perwira Agong Negara Brunei Yang Amat Setia Darjah Pertama - P.A.N.B.
N.B. * decoration founded by the sultan on 1st August 1968 ; ** = decoration founded by the sultan on 15th August 1982

 Queen Saleha :
  Recipient of the Royal Family Order of the Crown of Brunei (DKMB) 
  Senior (Laila Utama) of the Family Order of Brunei (DK I) 
  Pingat Hassanal Bolkiah Sultan (Sultan Hassanal Bolkiah Medal - PHBS, 1.8.1968) 
 Hajah Mariam binti Haji ‘Abdu’l Aziz, Sultan's second divorced wife
  Recipient of the Royal Family Order of the Crown of Brunei (DKMB)
  First Class (Dato Paduka Seri) of the Most Exalted Order of Famous Valour  (DPKT, 29.11.1996)
 Azrinaz Mazhar binti Hakim Mazhar, Sultan's third wife (m. 2005 - div. 2010)
  Recipient of the Royal Family Order of the Crown of Brunei (DKMB, 20.8.2005, revoked after divorce)
 Al-Muhtadee Billah, Crown Prince of Brunei (son of Queen Saleha, b. 17 February 1974)
  Recipient of the Royal Family Order of the Crown of Brunei (DKMB, 15.8.1982)
  First Class (Dato Paduka Seri) of the Most Exalted Order of Famous Valour  (DPKT, 31.5.2004)
  Pingat Hassanal Bolkiah Sultan Darjah Pertama (Sultan Hassanal Bolkiah Medal - PHBS)
 Sarah binti Pangiran Haji Salleh Abdul Rahaman, his wife
  Senior (Laila Utama) of the Most Esteemed Family Order of Brunei (DK I, 15.7.2005)
 Abdul Azim, second son of the Sultan (& Mariam, b. 29 July 1982)
  Recipient of the Royal Family Order of the Crown of Brunei (DKMB)
 Abdul Malik, third son of the Sultan {& Queen Saleha, b. 30 June 1983}
  Recipient of the Royal Family Order of the Crown of Brunei (DKMB)
  Pingat Hassanal Bolkiah Sultan (Sultan Hassanal Bolkiah Medal - PHBS).
  Brunei Independence (1 January 1984). 
  Silver Jubilee Medal (4 October 1992).

 Rashida, elder daughter of the Sultan (& Queen Saleha, b. 26 July 1969)
  Recipient of the Royal Family Order of the Crown of Brunei (DKMB)
 Muta-Wakkilah, second daughter of the Sultan (& Queen Saleha, b. 12 October 1971)
  Recipient of the Royal Family Order of the Crown of Brunei (DKMB)
 Majeedah, third daughter of the Sultan (& Queen Saleha, b. 16 March 1976)
  Recipient of the Royal Family Order of the Crown of Brunei (DKMB)
 Hafizah, fourth daughter of the Sultan (& Queen Saleha, b. 12 March 1980)
  Recipient of the Royal Family Order of the Crown of Brunei (DKMB)
 Azemah, fifth daughter of the Sultan (& Mariam, b. 26 September 1984)
  Recipient of the Royal Family Order of the Crown of Brunei (DKMB)
 Fadzillah, sixth daughter of the Sultan (& Mariam, b. 23 August 1985)
  Recipient of the Royal Family Order of the Crown of Brunei (DKMB)

 Family of Mohamed
 Mohamed Bolkiah, elder brother of Sultan Hassanal Bolkiah
  Royal Family Order of the Crown of Brunei - Darjah Kerabat Mahkota Brunei (DKMB) 
  Royal Family Order of Brunei, First Class - Darjah Kerabat Laila Utama (DK, 1963)
  Pingat Hassanal Bolkiah Sultan Darjah Pertama (Sultan Hassanal Bolkiah Medal - PHBS, 1.8.1968) 
  Pingat Bakti Laila Ikhlas (Armed Forced Service Medal - PBLI, 1975)
  Pingat Jasa Kebaktian (Meritorius Service Medal - PJK, 1954)
 Zariah, his wife :
  Senior (Laila Utama) of the Family Order of Brunei (DK I, 1972) 
  Second Class (Dato Laila Jasa) of the Most Distinguished Order of Merit of Brunei (DSLJ, 1971)

 Family of Sufri
 Sufri Bolkiah, second brother of Sultan Hassanal Bolkiah
  Senior (Laila Utama) of the Family Order of Brunei (DK I, 1970)
  Junior (Sri Utama) of the Family Order of Brunei (DK II, 1968) 
  Pingat Hassanal Bolkiah Sultan Darjah Pertama (Sultan Hassanal Bolkiah Medal - PHBS, 1.8.1968)
 Salma, his first wife (m. 1971 - div. 1981) 
  Senior (Laila Utama) of the Family Order of Brunei (DK I, 1972)
 Dayang Hajjah Siti Ruhaizah binti Ibrahim, his second wife (m. 1982 - div. 1986)
 Dayang Hajjah Mazuin binti Hamzah, his third wife (m. 1987 - div. 2003)
  Senior (Laila Utama) of the Family Order of Brunei (DK I, 15.7.1990)

 Family of Jefri
 Jefri Bolkiah, third brother of Sultan Hassanal Bolkiah
  Recipient of the Royal Family Order of the Crown of Brunei (DKMB)
  Senior (Laila Utama) of the Family Order of Brunei (DK I, 26.12.1970)

Monarchies 

 ASIAN MONARCHIES

 Far East

Thai Royal Family 

 Queen Sirikit of Thailand : 
  Senior (Laila Utama) of the Most Esteemed Family Order of Brunei (DK II, 1990)
 Princess Sirindhorn of Thailand : 
  Senior (Laila Utama) of the Most Esteemed Family Order of Brunei (DK II, 1990)

Malaysian Yang di-Pertuan Agongs & Royal Families

Johor Royal Family 

 Ibrahim Ismail of Johor (Sultan Johor) :
  Recipient of  Royal Family Order of the Crown of Brunei (DKMB)

Kelantan Royal Family 
They have been awarded:

 Ismail Petra of Kelantan, Sultan Muhammad V of Kelantan's father and retired Sultan for illness :
   Recipient of Royal Family Order of the Crown of Brunei (DKMB)
 Raja Perampuan Anis, Sultan Muhammad V of Kelantan's mother :
  Senior (Laila Utama) of the Most Esteemed Family Order of Brunei (DK I)

Pahang Royal Family 

 Ahmad Shah of Pahang (Yang di-Pertuan Agong, 29 March 1979 – 25 April 1984) :
  Recipient of Royal Family Order of the Crown of Brunei (DKMB)
  Senior (Laila Utama) of the Family Order of Brunei (DK)

Perlis Royal Family 
 Sirajuddin of Perlis (as Yang di-Pertuan Agong of Malaysia, 12/2001–12/2006) : 
   Recipient of the Royal Family Order of the Crown of Brunei (DKMB, 11.8.2002)

Terengganu Royal Family 
 Mizan Zainal Abidin of Terengganu (Sultan : since 15 May 1998 - Y.d-P.A. 12/2006-12/2011):
  Recipient of the Royal Family Order of the Crown of Brunei (DKMB)

 Middle East

Jordanian Royal Family 
They have been awarded :

 Queen Noor of Jordan : 
  Senior (Laila Utama) of the Most Esteemed Family Order of Brunei (DK I, 1984) 
 Abdullah II of Jordan  : 
  Recipient of the Royal Family Order of the Crown of Brunei (DKMB, 13 May 2008) 
 Queen Rania of Jordan : 
  Senior (Laila Utama) of the Most Esteemed Family Order of Brunei (DK I, 1984) 
 Princess Aisha bint Hussein, daughter of Princess Muna of Jordan, full-blood sister of Abdullah II and Princess Zein's twin.
  First Class (Dato Paduka Seri Laila Jasa) of the Order of Merit of Brunei (PSLJ,  13.5.2008) 
 Princess Zein bint Hussein, daughter of Princess Muna of Jordan, full-blood sister of Abdullah II and Princess Aisha's twin
  First Class (Dato Paduka Seri Laila Jasa) of the Order of Merit of Brunei (PSLJ, 13.5.2008) 
 Basma bint Talal, sister of King Hussein I of Jordan : 
  Senior (Laila Utama) of the Most Esteemed Family Order of Brunei (DK I,  22.7.2000) 
 Sayyid Walid al-Kurdi, Basma bint Talal's second husband : 
  First Class (Dato Seri Sitia) of the Order of Loyalty to the State of Brunei (PSNB, 16.7.2002)

Saudi Royal Family 
 Salman of Saudi Arabia  : 
  Recipient of the Royal Family Order of the Crown of Brunei (DKMB, 4 March 2017)

 EUROPEAN MONARCHIES

British Royal Family 
 The Queen  : 
  Recipient of the Royal Family Order of the Crown of Brunei (DKMB, 1992) 
  Senior (Laila Utama) of the Most Esteemed Family Order of Brunei (DK I, 1972)
  Sultan's Silver Jubilee Medal (1992)

Dutch Royal Family 
 King Willem-Alexander of the Netherlands (when Crown Prince) : 
  Senior (Laila Utama) of the Most Esteemed Family Order of Brunei (DK I, 01/2013) 
 Queen Queen Máxima of the Netherlands (when Crown Princess) : 
  Senior (Laila Utama) of the Most Esteemed Family Order of Brunei (DK I, 01/2013) 
 Princess Beatrix of the Netherlands (when Queen) : 
  Recipient of the Royal Family Order of the Crown of Brunei (DKMB, 01/2013)

See also 
 Mirror page : List of honours of the Bruneian Royal Family by country

References 

Brunei